"Have You Ever Loved Somebody" is a 1986 R&B/Soul single by American singer Freddie Jackson and written by Barry Eastmond and Jolyon Skinner.

Background
The single was his second release from the album Just Like the First Time and his fifth number one on the Hot Black Singles chart, staying at the top spot for two weeks.  "Have You Ever Loved Somebody" peaked at number 69 on the Hot 100, Outside the US, "Have You Ever Loved Somebody" went to number 33 on the UK Singles Chart.

The music video for Have You Ever Loved Somebody was directed by Michael Oblowitz in Miami and New York, in 1986.

Samples
This song was sampled for the Glasses Malone record "Sun Comes Up". Smooth jazz musician Najee covered the song featuring Jackson on his 1998 greatest hits album, The Best of Najee.
Producer Dame Grease also sampled this for the track 'Have You Eva' by DMX (rapper) on his 2012 album Undisputed.

In popular culture
 The song appears in-game in the fictional radio station The Vibe 98.8 in the 2008 video game Grand Theft Auto IV .

See also
 R&B number-one hits of 1987 (USA)

References

1986 singles
1986 songs
Freddie Jackson songs
Songs written by Barry Eastmond
Songs written by Jolyon Skinner